The 2018 LNB Pro A Leaders Cup season was the 22nd edition of this tournament, the fifth since it was renamed as Leaders Cup. The event included the eight top teams from the first half of the 2017–18 Pro A regular season and was played in Disneyland Paris. AS Monaco Basket won its third consecutive title after beating Le Mans Sarthe in the Final.

Bracket

Final

References

Leaders Cup
Leaders Cup